H. aurea  may refer to:
 Halydaia aurea, a tachinid fly species
 Hypseleotris aurea, the golden gudgeon, a fish species endemic to Australia

Synonyms
 Heliconia aurea, a synonym for Heliconia bihai, the red palulu, an erect herb species native to South America, specially Brazil and Guianas

See also
 Aurea (disambiguation)